Wolfgang Wild (born 20 September 1930) is a German nuclear physicist, academic administrator and politician. He was President of the Technical University of Munich between 1980 and 1986 and Bavarian Minister of Science between 1986 and 1989.

Career 
Wild studied physics at the Ludwig Maximilian University of Munich. After receiving his doctorate in 1955, he first worked as an assistant to Heinz Maier-Leibnitz at the Technical University of Munich. In 1957 he moved to Heidelberg University, where he investigated atomic nuclei with J. Hans D. Jensen, who later won the Nobel Prize.

His habilitation in 1960 was followed the following year by an associate professorship at the Free University of Berlin. In November of the same year, he took over the Chair of Theoretical Physics at the Department of Physics of the Technical University of Munich.

Political career 
After the 1986 Bavarian state election, Franz Josef Strauss appointed Wild the first Bavarian Minister of Science.

Awards 
 Bavarian Order of Merit
 Order of Merit of the Federal Republic of Germany, 1st class

References 

Living people
1930 births
Christian Social Union in Bavaria politicians
Knights Commander of the Order of St Gregory the Great
Officers Crosses of the Order of Merit of the Federal Republic of Germany
Academic staff of the Technical University of Munich
Presidents of the Technical University of Munich
Academic staff of the Free University of Berlin
Ludwig Maximilian University of Munich alumni
German nuclear physicists
20th-century German physicists
Nuclear physicists